Ceferino is a given name. Notable people with the name include:

Ceferino Garcia (1912–1981), champion boxer born in Naval, Biliran, Philippines
Ceferino Giménez Malla (1861–1936), Spanish Roman Catholic catechist and activist for Spanish Romani causes
Ceferino Labarda (born 1981), bantamweight boxer from Argentina
Ceferino Namuncurá (1886–1905), saintly religious student venerated in northern Patagonia and throughout Argentina
Ceferino Peroné (1924–2015), Argentine cyclist
Ceferino Quintana (1894–1977), American politician

See also
Zeferino
Zephyrinus